Kiss Me Kate is a British sitcom that ran from 1998 until 2000.  It followed the everyday life of a  counsellor, Kate (Caroline Quentin), who must not only manage her clients' problems, but must also help her neighbours and unsuccessful business partner, Douglas, played by Chris Langham. Amanda Holden played Mel, the receptionist. Darren Boyd played the sweet, but intellectually challenged, Craig, the travel agent downstairs.

During the series, both Craig and Douglas fall for Kate. Mel and Craig become romantically involved, but Douglas continues to be in love with Kate. Kate then falls for Douglas's brother, Iain Cameron, a successful cardiac surgeon.

It was written by Chris Langham and John Morton, who had collaborated on People Like Us.

Cast

Main
 Caroline Quentin, Kate Salinger
 Chris Langham, Douglas Fielding/Cameron
 Amanda Holden, Mel
 Darren Boyd, Craig Chapman

Recurring
Cliff Parisi, Tony (Series 1 and 2 only)
Mark Heap, Peter (Series 1 only)
Holly Atkins, Alex (Series 2 only)
Elizabeth Renihan, Jo (Series 3 only)
Bill Nighy, Douglas' brother, Iain Cameron

Episodes

Filming locations
Filming took place at the now closed Carlton Television Studios in Nottingham in front of a live studio audience. At the beginning of each series the crew spent four days filming all exterior scenes at various locations in and around Nottingham.

The main building that housed the office and Kate's flat is situated on East Circus Street, Nottingham, directly opposite the Nottingham Playhouse.

The building used in the third series as the exterior of "Cafe Coffee" is in reality a casino located at the junction of St. Peters Gate and Bridlesmith Gate, Nottingham.

The building used as the location of Iain's flat is situated on Broadway in the Lace Market area of Nottingham.

Other locations used throughout the series include the University of Nottingham, the Peacock Inn at Redmile, Leicestershire  and Nottingham's Victoria Embankment.

External links 

1998 British television series debuts
2000 British television series endings
1990s British sitcoms
2000s British sitcoms
BBC television sitcoms
Carlton Television
Television series by ITV Studios
English-language television shows
Television shows set in Nottinghamshire